This is a list of Estonian television related events from 1973.

Events

Debuts
Mõmmi ja aabits

Television shows

Ending this year

Births
20 February - Indrek Saar, actor and politician  
3 August - Aigi Vahing (:et), actress
14 December - Jan Uuspõld, actor

Deaths

References